In 2012, while on bail Julian Assange was granted political asylum in the Ecuadorian Embassy in London, where he sought to avoid extradition to Sweden, and what his supporters said was the possibility of subsequent extradition to the US. On 11 April 2019, Ecuador revoked his asylum, he was arrested for failing to appear in court, and carried out of the Embassy by members of the London Metropolitan Police. Following his arrest, the US revealed a previously sealed 2018 US indictment in which Assange was charged with conspiracy to commit computer intrusion related to his involvement with Chelsea Manning and WikiLeaks.

On 23 May 2019, a US grand jury added 17 espionage charges also related to his involvement with Chelsea Manning, making a total of 18 federal charges against Assange in the US. On 25 June 2020 a new indictment was filed alleging that since 2009, Assange had attempted to recruit hackers and system administrators at conferences around the world and conspired with hackers including members of LulzSec and Anonymous. The new indictment described Assange's alleged efforts to recruit system administrators, Assange and WikiLeaks' role in helping Snowden flee the US, and their use of Snowden as a recruitment tool, and WikiLeaks' exploiting a vulnerability in the United States Congress' system to access and publish the Congressional Research Service reports. Assange's defenders have responded to U.S. accusations, describing him as a journalist who did nothing more than publish leaked information that embarrassed the U.S. government.

While there was support from some American journalism institutions and from bi-partisan politicians for Assange's arrest and indictment, several non-government organisations for press freedom condemned it. The New York Times' Editorial Board warned that "The administration has begun well by charging Mr. Assange with an indisputable crime. But there is always a risk with this administration — one that labels the free press as “the enemy of the people” — that the prosecution of Mr. Assange could become an assault on the First Amendment and whistle-blowers."

In December 2021, the High Court of Justice ruled that Assange may be extradited to the US.

Background

Publication of material from Manning
In 2010 while working with WikiLeaks, Assange was contacted by Chelsea Manning, who gave him classified information containing various military operations conducted by the US government abroad. The material included the Baghdad airstrike of 2007, Granai Airstrike of 2009, the Iraq War Logs, Afghan War Diaries, and the Afghan War Logs, among others. Some of these documents were published by WikiLeaks and leaked to other major media houses including The Guardian between 2010 and 2011.

Critics of the release included Julia Gillard, then Australian Prime Minister, who said the act was illegal, and the vice-president of the United States, Joe Biden, who called him a terrorist. Others, including Brazilian president Luiz da Silva and Ecuadorean president Rafael Correa, supported his actions, while sources in Russian president Dmitry Medvedev's office said he deserved a Nobel prize for his actions. The Manning leaks also led WikiLeaks and Julian Assange to receive various accolades and awards, but at the same time attracted criticism and police investigations.

Criminal investigation and indictment
Following the Manning leaks, authorities in the US began investigating Assange and WikiLeaks. Assange broke bail to avoid extradition to Sweden, where he was wanted for questioning in connection with an arrest warrant for one charge of unlawful coercion, two charges of sexual molestation, and one charge of rape, and became a fugitive. The Australian government distanced itself from Assange.

In 2012, he sought and gained political asylum from Ecuador, granted by Rafael Correa, after visiting the country's embassy in London.

At the same time, an investigation by the FBI was going on regarding Assange's release of the Manning documents, and according to court documents dated May 2014, he was still under active and ongoing investigation. A warrant issued to Google by the district court cited several crimes, including espionage, conspiracy to commit espionage, theft or conversion of property belonging to the United States government, violation of the Computer Fraud and Abuse Act and general conspiracy.

An indictment against Assange was filed on 6 March 2018 and remained sealed until 11 April 2019.

In February 2019, Chelsea Manning was subpoenaed to appear before a grand jury in Virginia in the case. When Manning condemned the secrecy of the hearings and refused to testify, she was jailed for contempt of court on 8 March 2019. On 16 May 2019, Manning refused to testify before a new grand jury investigating Assange, stating that she "believe[d] this grand jury seeks to undermine the integrity of public discourse with the aim of punishing those who expose any serious, ongoing, and systemic abuses of power by this government". She was returned to jail for the 18-month term of the grand jury with financial penalties. In June 2021, Chelsea Manning said her grand jury resistance was not contingent on Assange being the target, and that she was not even sure he was. "I treated this no differently than if it was for a protest or for some other grand jury—if it was a grand jury in general, I would respond the same way. But it did appear that this one was about, specifically, the 2010 disclosures; the media was speculating, but our legal team and ourselves, we never got full confirmation as to whether that was the case."

Arrest by the Metropolitan Police 
After Assange's asylum was revoked, the Ambassador of Ecuador to the UK invited the Metropolitan Police into the embassy on 11 April 2019. Assange was arrested and taken to a central London police station. Foreign Minister José Valencia said an audio recording captured Assange threatening Ambassador Jaime Merchan with a panic button that he said would bring devastating consequences for the Embassy in the event of his arrest. Ecuador's authorities shared the threat with British authorities and when arresting Assange they were careful to not let him trigger any possible emergency plans.

Assange was carrying Gore Vidal's History of the National Security State during his forcible removal from the embassy and shouted "the UK has no sovereignty" and "the UK must resist this attempt by the Trump administration ... " as five police officers put him into a van. The news of the arrest went viral within minutes and several media outlets reported it as breaking news. President Moreno called Assange a "spoiled brat" in the wake of the arrest.

CNN reported that "British police entered the Ecuadorian Embassy in London... forcibly removing the WikiLeaks founder Julian Assange on a US extradition warrant and bringing his seven-year stint there to a dramatic close." At a hearing at Westminster Magistrates' Court a few hours after his arrest, the presiding judge found Assange was guilty of breaching the terms of his bail. On 1 May 2019, Assange was sentenced to 50 weeks in prison.

Assange was arrested in April, after being carried out of the Ecuadorian Embassy in London, where he had been living since 2012, avoiding an international arrest warrant, was sentenced to 50 weeks in prison by a British judge on 1 May 2019.

Judge Deborah Taylor said Assange's time in the embassy had cost British taxpayers the equivalent of nearly $21 million, and that he had sought asylum in a "deliberate attempt to delay justice."

Assange offered a written apology in court, stating that his actions were a response to terrifying circumstances. He said he had been effectively imprisoned in the embassy; two doctors also provided medical evidence of the mental and physical effects of being confined. To which the judge Deborah Taylor said "You were not living under prison conditions, and you could have left at any time to face due process with the rights and protections which the legal system in this country provides".

Indictments by the Department of Justice

Accidental revelation
In 2012 and 2013, US officials indicated that Assange was not named in a sealed indictment. On 6 March 2018, a federal grand jury for the Eastern District of Virginia issued a sealed indictment against Assange. In November 2018, US prosecutors accidentally revealed that Assange had been indicted under seal in US federal court; the revelation came as a result of an error in a different court filing, unrelated to Assange.

First indictment

Charge of conspiracy to commit computer intrusion 
On 11 April 2019, the day of Assange's arrest in London, the indictment against him was unsealed. He was charged with conspiracy to commit computer intrusion (i.e. hacking into a government computer), a crime that carries a maximum 5-year sentence.

The charges allege that Assange sought to help Chelsea Manning crack a password hash so that Manning could use a different username to download classified documents. This "would have made it more difficult for investigators to identify Manning as the source of disclosures of classified information". This allegation had been known since 2011 and is a less serious charge than those levelled against Manning, and carries a maximum sentence of five years. The US pointed to chat logs and filed an affidavit that said they were able to identify Assange as the person chatting with Manning using hints he made during the chats and that Manning identified him as Assange to Adrian Lamo.

Superseding indictment

Charges under the Espionage Act 
On 23 May 2019, Assange was indicted on 17 new charges relating to the Espionage Act of 1917 in the United States District Court for the Eastern District of Virginia. The charges are related to his involvement with Chelsea Manning, a former US Army intelligence analyst who gave Assange classified information concerning matters surrounding the US Defense Department. The new charges relate to obtaining and publishing the secret documents. Most of these charges relate to obtaining the secret documents. The three charges related to publication concern documents which revealed the names of sources in dangerous places putting them "at a grave and imminent risk" of harm or detention.

On 25 March 2020, a London court denied Assange bail, after Judge Vanessa Baraitser rejected his lawyers' argument that his stay in prison would put him at high risk of contracting COVID-19 due to his previous respiratory tract infections and a heart problem. Judge Baraitser said that Assange's past conduct showed how far he was willing to go to avoid extradition to the United States.

Second superseding indictment 
In late June 2020, a grand jury expanded the indictment against Assange. The new indictment alleged that Assange and WikiLeaks attempted to recruit hackers at conferences around the world as far back as 2009, giving the example of Assange telling the Hacking At Random conference that WikiLeaks had obtained nonpublic documents from the Congressional Research Service by exploiting "a small vulnerability" in the United States Congress' document distribution system, telling them "[t]his is what any one of you would find if you were actually looking." The charging document also accused Assange of "gaining unauthorised access to a government computer system of a NATO country in 2010" and in 2012 of conspiring with hackers including members of LulzSec and Anonymous. The indictment also described Assange and WikiLeak's alleged efforts to recruit system administrators to be sources, and Assange and WikiLeaks' role in helping Snowden flee the US, and their use of Snowden as a recruitment tool.

Aftermath of his arrest

Extradition hearings
On 25 February 2020, one of the barristers representing Assange, Edward Fitzgerald revealed to District Judge Vanessa Baraitser that Dana Rohrabacher, as an emissary of President Donald Trump, had offered Assange a pardon from President Trump, if Assange could offer material identifying the source of email leaks from the Democratic National Committee during 2016.

In October 2021, US authorities told a British judge that if convicted, Assange could serve any prison sentence in Australia and that he "has no history of serious and enduring mental illness". On 20 April 2022, a British judge formally issued Assange's extradition order. The decision was sent to the UK government, where the Home Secretary Priti Patel was to finalize his transfer to the US. Assange can appeal the decision by judicial review, if it is approved by Patel. On 18 June 2022, Patel approved the decision to extradite Assange in the United States; Assange announced that he would appeal the decision. On 22 August 2022, Assange's legal team lodged a Perfected Grounds of Appeal before the High Court challenging District Judge Vanessa Baraitser's decision of 4 January 2021 with new evidence. In November 2022, he made a further appeal to the European Court of Human Rights.

Reactions to the indictment
While some US politicians supported the arrest and indictment of Julian Assange, several jurists, politicians, associations, academics and campaigners viewed the arrest of Assange as an attack on freedom of the press and international law. Reporters Without Borders said Assange's arrest could "set a dangerous precedent for journalists, whistle-blowers, and other journalistic sources that the US may wish to pursue in the future." Kenneth Roth, executive director of Human Rights Watch, wrote that Assange's prosecution for publishing leaked documents is "a major threat to global media freedom". United Nations rights expert Agnes Callamard said the arrest of Assange "exposed him to the risk of serious human rights violations, if extradited to the United States". The yellow vests movement called for Assange's release.

Reactions in the UK and the EU
Dutch senator Tiny Kox (Socialist Party) asked the Council of Europe's commissioner for human rights, Dunja Mijatović, whether the arrest of Assange and his possible extradition to the US were in line with the criteria of the European Convention on Human Rights. In January 2020, the Parliamentary Assembly of the Council of Europe voted to oppose Assange's extradition to the US.

In 2019, British Labour Party leader Jeremy Corbyn said that Assange had revealed "evidence of atrocities in Iraq and Afghanistan" and his extradition to the United States "should be opposed by the British government". In February 2020, Corbyn again praised Assange, demanding a halt to the extradition. Prime Minister Boris Johnson responded vaguely with "it’s obvious that the rights of journalists and whistleblowers should be upheld and this government will continue to do that.”

Eva Joly, magistrate and MEP for Europe Ecology–The Greens, said that "the arrest of Julian Assange is an attack on freedom of expression, international law and right to asylum". Sevim Dagdelen, a German Bundestag MP for The Left who specialises in international law and press law, describes Assange's arrest as "an attack on independent journalism" and says that he "is today seriously endangered". Dick Marty, a former state prosecutor of Ticino and rapporteur on the CIA's secret prisons for the Council of Europe, considers the arrest of whistleblowers "very shocking". Several well-known Swiss jurists have asked the Federal Council to grant asylum to the founder of WikiLeaks because he is threatened with extradition to the United States, which in the past "silenced whistleblowers".

In a letter, the two French Unions of Journalists and  asked Emmanuel Macron to enforce Article 10 of the European Convention on Human Rights. According them, "Faced with threats to Julian Assange's health and at the risk of seeing him sentenced to life imprisonment, we are saying loud and clear, with the IFJ (Fédération internationale des journalistes) that 'journalism is not a crime'". They add:

WikiLeaks was recognised as a "media organisation" in 2017 by a UK tribunal, contradicting public assertions to the contrary by some US officials, and possibly supporting Assange's efforts to oppose his extradition to the United States.

According to Amnesty International's Massimo Moratti, if extradited to the United States, Assange may face the "risk of serious human rights violations, namely detention conditions, which could violate the prohibition of torture".

Reactions in the US
While there was support from some American journalism institutions and from bi-partisan politicians for Assange's arrest and indictment, several non-government organisations for press freedom condemned it. Mark Warner, vice chairman of the United States Senate Select Committee on Intelligence, said that Assange was "a dedicated accomplice in efforts to undermine American security". Senate Judiciary Committee Chairman Lindsey Graham and Senator Joe Manchin also spoke in support of the arrest and indictment.

After Assange's arrest and first indictment, the New York Times' Editorial Board wrote that "The case of Mr. Assange, who got his start as a computer hacker, illuminates the conflict of freedom and harm in the new technologies, and could help draw a sharp line between legitimate journalism and dangerous cybercrime." The editorial board also warned that "The administration has begun well by charging Mr. Assange with an indisputable crime. But there is always a risk with this administration — one that labels the free press as “the enemy of the people” — that the prosecution of Mr. Assange could become an assault on the First Amendment and whistle-blowers." The Washington Posts Editorial Board wrote that Assange was "not a free-press hero" or a journalist, and that he was "long overdue for personal accountability."

Frida Ghitis warned that "while Assange is not a journalist, his arrest does present a potential threat to other journalists. One can easily foresee someone like President Donald Trump using the precedent against others reporting information he doesn't like. If a man who claims he is a journalist can be arrested and prosecuted for his work, others could also be charged."

The Associated Press reported that the indictment raised concerns about media freedom, as Assange's solicitation and publication of classified information is a routine job journalists perform. Stephen Vladeck, a professor at the University of Texas School of Law, stated that what Assange is accused of doing is factually different from, but legally similar to what professional journalists do. Vladeck also said the Espionage Act charges could provide Assange with an argument against extradition under the US-UK treaty, as there is an exemption in the treaty for political offences.Suzanne Nossel of PEN America said it was immaterial if Assange was a journalist or publisher and pointed instead to First Amendment concerns.

In a call with reporters, U.S. Attorney Terwilliger said that "Assange is charged for his alleged complicity in illegal acts to obtain or receive voluminous databases of classified information and for agreeing and attempting to obtain classified information through computer hacking. The United States has not charged Assange for passively obtaining or receiving classified information." Assistant Attorney General John Demers said "Julian Assange is no journalist".

The US allegation that Assange's publication of these secrets was illegal was deemed controversial by Australia's Seven News as well as CNN. The Cato Institute also questioned the US government's position which attempts to position Assange as not a journalist. The New York Times commented that it and other news organisations obtained the same documents as WikiLeaks, also without government authorisation. It also said it is not clear how WikiLeaks' publications are legally different from other publications of classified information. Forbes magazine stated that the US government created an outcry among journalists in its indictment of Assange as the US sought to debate whether Assange was a journalist or not.

The deputy director of the Committee to Protect Journalists, Robert Mahoney, said "With this prosecution of Julian Assange, the US government could set out broad legal arguments about journalists soliciting information or interacting with sources that could have chilling consequences for investigative reporting and the publication of information of public interest." According to Yochai Benkler, a Harvard law professor, the charge sheet contained some "very dangerous elements that pose significant risk to national security reporting. Sections of the indictment are vastly overbroad and could have a significant chilling effect – they ought to be rejected." Carrie DeCell, staff attorney with the Knight First Amendment Institute at Columbia University, said the charges "risk having a chill on journalism". She added, "Many of the allegations fall absolutely within the first amendment's protections of journalistic activity. That's very troubling to us."

Ben Wizner from the American Civil Liberties Union (ACLU) said that if authorities were to prosecute Assange "for violating US secrecy laws [it] would set an especially dangerous precedent for US journalists, who routinely violate foreign secrecy laws to deliver information vital to the public's interest." BuzzFeed reported that most cases brought under the Espionage Act have been against government employees who accessed sensitive information and leaked it to journalists and others. According to the New York Times, prosecuting people for acts related to receiving and publishing information has not previously been tested in court.

NSA whistleblower Edward Snowden and the Pentagon Papers whistleblower Daniel Ellsberg condemned the indictment. Snowden tweeted that "Assange's critics may cheer, but this is a dark moment for press freedom." Daniel Ellsberg said:

According to Ron Paul, Assange should receive the same kind of protections as the mainstream media when it comes to releasing information. He said "In a free society we're supposed to know the truth ... In a society where truth becomes treason, then we're in big trouble. And now, people who are revealing the truth are getting into trouble for it." He added "This is media, isn't it? I mean, why don't we prosecute The New York Times  or anybody that releases this?"

Ecuadorian president Lenín Moreno, the Australian Prime Minister Scott Morrison, the British Foreign Secretary, Jeremy Hunt, U.S. Senators Mark Warner, Lindsey Graham and Senator Joe Manchin, Hillary Clinton campaign advisor Neera Tanden, and British Prime Minister Theresa May, who commented that "no one is above the law," supported the arrest. Alternatively, it has been asserted that such a move would be a threat to freedom of speech as protected by the First Amendment to the United States Constitution. This view is held by Edward Snowden, Rafael Correa, Chelsea Manning, Jeremy Corbyn, Kenneth Roth of Human Rights Watch, and Glenn Greenwald, who said "it's the criminalization of journalism".

The president of the Center for American Progress and former Obama aide Neera Tanden also welcomed the arrest and condemned Assange's leftist supporters, tweeting that "the Assange cultists are the worst. Assange was the agent of a proto-fascist state, Russia, to undermine democracy. That is fascist behaviour. Anyone on the left should abhor what he did." Freedom of the Press Foundation said: "Whether or not you like Assange, the charge against him is a serious press freedom threat and should be vigorously protested by all those who care about the first amendment."

Reactions in Australia
In October 2019, former deputy prime minister Barnaby Joyce (National Party of Australia) called for the federal government to take action to stop Assange being extradited from the United Kingdom to the US. Later in October, the cross-party Bring Assange Home Parliamentary Working Group was established. Its co-chairs are independent Andrew Wilkie and Liberal National MP George Christensen. Its members include Greens Richard Di Natale, Adam Bandt and Peter Whish-Wilson, Centre Alliance MPs Rebekha Sharkie and Rex Patrick and independent Zali Steggall.

In the lead up to an extradition hearing on 1 June 2020, more than 100 politicians, journalists, lawyers and human rights activists from Australia wrote to Foreign Minister Marise Payne, asking her to make urgent representations to the UK government to have Assange released on bail due to his ill-health.

Other reactions
Former Ecuadorian president Rafael Correa condemned Assange's arrest. Former Bolivian President Evo Morales also condemned it. Maria Zakharova, spokesperson for the Russian Ministry of Foreign Affairs, condemned the indictment. The then-ex-President of Brazil Luiz Inácio Lula da Silva said that "Humanity should demand its freedom. Instead of being imprisoned he should be treated like a hero", during his visit in Genebra.

Ecuadorean president Lenín Moreno said in a video posted on Twitter that he "requested Great Britain to guarantee that Mr Assange would not be extradited to a country where he could face torture or the death penalty. The British government has confirmed it in writing, in accordance with its own rules." On 14 April 2019 Moreno stated in an interview with the British newspaper The Guardian that no other nation influenced his government's decision to revoke Assange's asylum in the embassy and that Assange did in fact use facilities in the embassy "to interfere in processes of other states." Moreno also stated "we can not allow our house, the house that opened its doors, to become a centre for spying" and noted that Assange also had poor hygiene. Moreno further stated "We never tried to expel Assange, as some political actors want everyone to believe. Given the constant violations of protocols and threats, political asylum became untenable."

On Assange's birthday in July 2020, 40 organizations, including the International Federation of Journalists, the National Union of Journalists, the National Lawyers Guild, the International Association of Democratic Lawyers, the Centre for Investigative Journalism and the World Association of Community Radio Broadcasters, wrote an open letter demanding that Assange be released.

There was widespread criticism that the second Assange indictment, which added Espionage charges, violated the First Amendment. Multiple organisations and journalists criticised the new charges.
The New York Times stated: "Julian Assange, the WikiLeaks leader, was indicted on 17 counts of violating the Espionage Act for his role in obtaining and publishing secret military and diplomatic documents in 2010, the Justice Department announced on Thursday — a novel case that raises profound First Amendment issues."
The Guardian said: "By bringing new charges against the WikiLeaks founder, the Trump administration has challenged the first amendment."
HuffPost said: "The charges against the WikiLeaks founder bring up huge First Amendment issues."
The Nation said: "The Indictment of Julian Assange Is a Threat to Press Freedom." 
The American Civil Liberties Union said: "For the first time in the history of our country, the government has brought criminal charges under the Espionage Act against a publisher for the publication of truthful information. This is a direct assault on the First Amendment."
Jonathan Turley described the Assange indictment under the Espionage Act of 1917 as "the most important press freedom case in the US in 300 years".

See also

 Assange v Swedish Prosecution Authority
 Surveillance of Julian Assange

References

External links
 
 

2019 controversies
2019 in Ecuador
2019 in law
2019 in London
Julian Assange
Legal cases involving WikiLeaks
Political controversies